Barolong Seboni (born 27 April 1957) is a poet and academic from Botswana.

Biography
Born in Kanye, Botswana, he received his BA from the University of Botswana and his master's degree from the University of Wisconsin–Madison. He has translated Botswana proverbs into English. He also had a column in the Botswana Guardian and has done work in other mediums including radio. Barolong is a founding member of the Botswana Writers´ Association (WABO).

Barolong wrote and translated Radio Scripts for Makgabaneng; a radio-based soap opera that aimed to promote safe sex and healthier lives in Botswana by portraying everyday life issues.

Bibliography
Seboni, B. (1986). Images of the Sun. African Studies Program of the University of Wisconsin-Madison. University of Wisconsin, African Studies Program, 1986
Screams and Pleas, ed. Seboni, Mmegi Publishing House, 1992
Lovesongs, Morula Publishers, 1994
Windsongs of the Kgalagdi, Macmillan, 1995
Botswana Cultural Directory, Morula Publishers, 1995
Botswana Poetry Anthology, ed. Seboni, and Biakolo, Morula Publishers, 2002
Lighting the Fire – Literature Anthology for Secondary Schools, Macmillan Botswana, 2003.

References

External links
A profile from a poetry festival
Article by him explaining why he writes

1957 births
Botswana male writers
Living people
University of Wisconsin–Madison alumni
Botswana expatriates in the United States
University of Botswana alumni
International Writing Program alumni
People from Kanye, Botswana
Botswana poets
Botswana radio presenters
Male poets
Botswana journalists
Male journalists
20th-century poets
21st-century poets
20th-century male writers
21st-century male writers